"Underflow" is a song by Australian singer Emma Louise, released on 7 November 2015 as the lead single from Emma Louise's second studio album Supercry. 

Emma Louise said "I wrote 'Underflow' about a feeling of knowing that a change is about to come. This feeling was bubbling up inside me. I knew that with the change would be both good and bad things. It’s about moving forward and accepting change. Whether it be the end of a relationship or the start of another exciting journey."

The song placed second at the 2016 Vanda & Young Global Songwriting Competition.

Music video
The music video premiered on 14 December 2015. Shot by Dylan Duclos, who said "Working with Emma was great. To collaborate with an artist who has such a clear direction in terms of her aesthetic and image was really cool and proved such a smooth process."

Reception
The Music said "[it] is an atmospheric, almost-haunting composition, at once both lush and starkly minimal, with the lyrics and music having come from a demonstrably personal place".

Lauren Ziegler from Indie Shuffle called the song "stunning" and "heartbreaking" saying "The instrumental layers see delicate, muffled piano trickles meeting an ambient, emotive soundscape. There's a real delicacy, a real vulnerability in Louise's breathy voice - I feel immediately, wholly enveloped by her melody and her lyrics. I'm hooked."

Track listings
Digital download
 "Underflow" - 3:37

Digital download
 "Underflow" (Little Dragon Remix) - 4:52

Digital download
 "Underflow" (Yeo Remix) - 4:52

References

Emma Louise songs
2015 singles
2015 songs